Sher-e-Bangla, meaning "Tiger of Bengal", may refer to:

 A.K. Fazlul Huq, Bangladeshi statesman in whose honor several institutions and places have been named
 Sher-e-Bangla Nagor, a neighborhood in Dhaka, named after Huq
 Sher-e-Bangla Cricket Stadium, named after Huq
 Sher-e-Bangla Agricultural University, named after Huq
 Sher-e-Bangla Medical College, named after Huq